Balzac Billy is the "Prairie Prognosticator", a man-sized groundhog mascot who prognosticates weather on Groundhog Day. He lives in Balzac, Alberta, 8 km north of Calgary, Alberta, Canada.   

According to the legend of Groundhog Day, the groundhog's behavior is a way of forecasting the weather. If the groundhog sees his shadow, it will mean that winter is to continue for six more weeks.  

The original groundhog created by Merle Osborne was replaced and the mascot was created by Calgary radio station CFAC program director Jim Kunkel in the late 1970s.

In 2019, Balzac Billy predicted an early spring.

In 2022, Balzac Billy predicted six more weeks of winter.

See also
Buckeye Chuck
Fred la marmotte (dead)
General Beauregard Lee
Punxsutawney Phil (dead) (alive)
Shubenacadie Sam
Staten Island Chuck
Stormy Marmot
Wiarton Willie

References

External links

Holiday characters
Canadian mascots
Fictional characters from Alberta
Groundhog Day